Pat Convery may refer to:

 Pat Convery (1896-?), Irish water polo player
 Pat Convery, Lord Mayor of Belfast